Neverovsky is a rural locality (a settlement) in Kupreyevskoye Rural Settlement, Gus-Khrustalny District, Vladimir Oblast, Russia. The population was 35 as of 2010.

Geography 
Neverovsky is located on the right bank of the Kolp River, 60 km southeast of Gus-Khrustalny (the district's administrative centre) by road. Malyukovsky is the nearest rural locality.

References 

Rural localities in Gus-Khrustalny District